Michelle Setlakwe is a Canadian politician, who was elected to the National Assembly of Quebec in the 2022 Quebec general election. She represents the riding of Mont-Royal–Outremont as a member of the Quebec Liberal Party.

She is the niece (https://gamachenadeau.ca/fr/avis/fiche/+raymond-c-setlakwe ) of former Canadian senator Raymond Setlakwe, and is married to former senator and federal cabinet minister Michael Fortier.

References

21st-century Canadian politicians
21st-century Canadian women politicians
Quebec Liberal Party MNAs
Women MNAs in Quebec
Politicians from Montreal
Canadian people of Armenian descent
Living people
Year of birth missing (living people)